Small-l liberal refers to people who are ideologically liberal but are not necessarily members of a political party named "Liberal".

It may refer to:

 Liberalism in Australia
 Moderates (Liberal Party of Australia), the moderate faction of the Liberal Party of Australia
 Liberalism in Canada
 Liberalism in the United Kingdom